"The Past" is the second single from the Chapter VII: Hope and Sorrow album produced by the American rock band Sevendust. This power ballad, with lead vocals from Lajon Witherspoon and featuring guest vocals by lead vocalist of the band Daughtry, Chris Daughtry, is a bit of a departure for the band, falling more into the post-grunge category than what fans have come to expect from Sevendust. "Sorrow", another song found on Chapter VII: Hope and Sorrow, is similar in tone and also contains guest vocals, this time by Myles Kennedy. The song doesn't feature music video.

Controversy
Florida TV station WFTV-Channel 9 reported that Sevendust's song "The Past" was played repeatedly by Casey Anthony, who has been charged with first-degree murder in the disappearance of her daughter, Caylee while she was out on bond. The track carries this lyric: "Beneath the water that's falling from my eyes, Lays a soul I've left behind." The song was also apparently a topic of discussion on "Nancy Grace", a nightly current affairs show on CNN's Headline News hosted by Nancy Ann Grace, an American legal commentator, television host, and former prosecutor.

Sevendust has issued the following statement regarding the matter, "After hearing the news that our song "The Past" was a topic of discussion on the Nancy Grace show yesterday, we would like to elaborate. The song was written as a song of hope. A song with positive message. To look back on your life and reflect and to feel good about getting through the rough times that everyone goes through, the roller coaster of life, so to speak." Also they added, "We regret that we've been linked to the horrible subject involving the disappearance of little Caylee Anthony. Most of us have children and have been saddened by the story from the beginning."

Personnel 
 Lajon Witherspoon – lead vocals
 Chris Daughtry - co-lead vocals
 John Connolly – lead guitar
 Sonny Mayo – rhythm guitar
 Vinnie Hornsby – bass
 Morgan Rose – drums

Charts

References

2008 singles
Sevendust songs
Post-grunge songs
Songs written by John Connolly (musician)
Songs written by Morgan Rose
Songs written by Lajon Witherspoon
Songs written by Vinnie Hornsby
Asylum Records singles
Music controversies
2008 controversies in the United States
2008 songs